H.E.A.T is a Swedish hard rock group that was formed in Upplands Väsby in 2007, when the prior bands Dream and Trading Fate merged. Currently fronted by Kenny Leckremo, the band's heavy sound is strongly influenced by past melodic rock groups such as Whitesnake, with H.E.A.T having supported musical acts such as Scorpions. Between autumn 2015 to summer 2017, the group focused entirely on writing and recording songs. Into the Great Unknown was released in 2017 via earMUSIC. H.E.A.T released H.E.A.T II in 2020, and Force Majeure in 2022 after reuniting with original vocalist Kenny Leckremo.

History 
The band were signed to Peter Stormares record label StormVox, and in 2008 the debut album H.E.A.T was released. The second album, titled Freedom Rock, came in 2010 on the same record label.

In 2011, they signed with GAIN music (Sony) and they also signed a new management, Hagenburg management.

In 2007, they were an opening act to Toto, and the following year they were the opening act to Sabaton and Alice Cooper, as well as performed at the Sweden Rock Festival that year. They were also awarded with the Årets nykomlingar award, an award given out by the Swedish radio station P4 Dist for the best new artist of the year, as voted by the listeners.

In 2009, the band played at the Melodifestivalen 2009, the Swedish qualifier to the annual Eurovision Song Contest, making it to the final round with the song "1000 Miles". The band have also toured around Europe as an opening act to Edguy in January 2009. Freedom Rock was ranked in the top 10 AOR/Melodic Rock albums of 2010 by Classic Rock Magazine. In July 2010, vocalist Kenny Leckremo announced he was leaving the band, and he was replaced by Erik Grönwall.

H.E.A.T released their third studio album, Address the Nation, on 28 March 2012. The first single from the album was "Living on the Run". It was the first album with new singer and was featured in many of the top 10 list of music sites around the internet. It also received a review of 98% on Melodicrock.com.

2014 saw the return of the much anticipated new album Tearing Down the Walls, and in October 2014 the band headlined the last ever Firefest concert at Rock City in Nottingham, England.

In early October 2016, guitar player Eric Rivers announced his departure from the band, and almost two weeks later it was announced that former guitar player Dave Dalone was replacing him – and therefore returning to the band since departing in 2013.

H.E.A.T released their fifth studio album, Into the Great Unknown, on 20 September 2017. The album saw the return of former guitarist Dave Dalone, who rejoined the band after the departure of Eric Rivers in 2016. Dave Ling of Classic Rock Magazine published the following quote in his review of Into the Great Unknown: "H.E.A.T. have just made the most complete album of their career. Watch their rise continue." 

H.E.A.T released H.E.A.T II on 21 February 2020. The band had to postpone many tour dates until 2021 due to the COVID-19 pandemic.

On 30 October 2020, the band announced via their official Facebook page that original singer Kenny Leckremo has rejoined the band replacing Erik Grönwall after he left to form New Horizon and later join Skid Row. In 2022, the new lineup released their new album Force Majeure, their first with Leckremo since 2010's Freedom Rock.

Members

Current members 
Jimmy Jay – bass guitar, backing vocals (2007–present)
Jona Tee – keyboards, backing vocals (2007–present)
Don Crash – drums (2007–present), backing vocals (2013–present)
Dave Dalone – guitar, backing vocals (2007–2013, 2016–present)
Kenny Leckremo – lead vocals (2007–2010, 2020-present)

Former members 
Eric Rivers (Erik Hammarbäck) – guitar, backing vocals (2007–2016)
Erik Grönwall – lead vocals (2010–2020)

Touring members 
Erik Modin - drums, backing vocals (2023)

Timeline

Discography

Studio albums 
H.E.A.T (2008)
Freedom Rock (2010)
Address the Nation (2012)
Tearing Down the Walls (2014)
Into the Great Unknown (2017)
H.E.A.T II (2020)
Force Majeure (2022)

EPs 
Beg, Beg, Beg (2010)
A Shot at Redemption (2014)

Live albums 
Live in London (2015)
Live at Sweden Rock Festival (2019)

Singles 
"1000 Miles" (2009)
"Keep On Dreaming" (2009)
"Beg, Beg, Beg" (2010)
"Living on the Run" (2012)
"A Shot at Redemption" (2014)
"Mannequin Show" (2014)
"Redefined" (2017)
"One by One" (2019)
"Rise" (2019)
"Come Clean" (2020)
"Dangerous Ground" (2020)
"Back to Life" (2020)
"Nationwide" (2022)
"Back to the Rhythm" (2022)

References 

General sources
 Sleaze Roxx: H.E.A.T. Set to "Address The Nation" On March 28th

External links 

 
 
 
 

Musical groups established in 2007
Swedish glam metal musical groups
Swedish heavy metal musical groups
Melodifestivalen contestants of 2009